The following is a list of works by Futurist artist Giacomo Balla.

See also 
 Category:Giacomo Balla on Wikimedia Commons

References

 
Balla, list of works
Balla, list of works
Balla, Giacomo